The men's 200 metre breaststroke was a swimming event held as part of the swimming at the 1932 Summer Olympics programme. It was the sixth appearance of the event, which was established in 1908. The competition was held from Thursday August 11, 1932 to Saturday August 13, 1932.

Eighteen swimmers from eleven nations competed.

Medalists

Records
These were the standing world and Olympic records (in minutes) prior to the 1932 Summer Olympics.

In the first heat Yoshiyuki Tsuruta improved his own Olympic record with 2:46.2 minutes. In the first semi-final Reizo Koike bettered the Olympic record with 2:44.9 minutes.

Results

Heats

Thursday August 11, 1932: The fastest two in each heat and the fastest third-placed from across the heats advanced to the final.

Heat 1

Heat 2

Heat 3

Heat 4

Semifinals

Friday August 12, 1932: The fastest three in each semi-final advanced to the final.

Semifinal 1

Semifinal 2

Final

Saturday August 13, 1932:

References

External links
Olympic Report
 

Swimming at the 1932 Summer Olympics
Men's events at the 1932 Summer Olympics